Oleg Aleksandrovich Vikulov (born January 24, 1987, in Penza) is a Russian platform diver. He won a gold medal, along with his partner Konstantin Khanbekov, for the men's synchronized platform at the 2008 FINA Diving World Cup series in Tijuana, Mexico, in addition to their silver in Nanjing, China, and a fourth-place finish in Sheffield, England. He also captured two medals (gold and bronze) in the individual and synchronized platform at the 2007 Summer Universiade in Bangkok, Thailand.

Vikulov represented Russia at the 2008 Summer Olympics in Beijing, where he competed for the men's platform event, along with his teammate Gleb Galperin (who eventually won the bronze medal in the final). He placed twenty-seventh out of thirty divers in the preliminary round by nine points behind Malaysia's Bryan Nickson Lomas, with a total score of 375.40 after six successive attempts.

References

External links
NBC 2008 Olympics profile

Russian male divers
Living people
Olympic divers of Russia
Divers at the 2008 Summer Olympics
Sportspeople from Penza
1987 births
Universiade medalists in diving
Universiade gold medalists for Russia
Universiade bronze medalists for Russia
Medalists at the 2007 Summer Universiade